Ljiljana Marković (born 11 February 1967) is a Yugoslav handball player. She competed in the women's tournament at the 1988 Summer Olympics.

References

1967 births
Living people
Yugoslav female handball players
Olympic handball players of Yugoslavia
Handball players at the 1988 Summer Olympics
Place of birth missing (living people)